Izabela Katarzyna Mrzygłocka (born 20 May 1959 in Wałbrzych) is a Polish politician. She was elected to the Sejm on September 25, 2005 getting 5271 votes in 2 Wałbrzych district, candidating from the Civic Platform list.

See also
Members of Polish Sejm 2005-2007

External links
Izabela Katarzyna Mrzygłocka - parliamentary page - includes declarations of interest, voting record, and transcripts of speeches.

Members of the Polish Sejm 2005–2007
Women members of the Sejm of the Republic of Poland
Civic Platform politicians
1959 births
Living people
People from Wałbrzych
21st-century Polish women politicians
Members of the Polish Sejm 2007–2011
Members of the Polish Sejm 2011–2015
Members of the Polish Sejm 2019–2023